Abubakar Aslambekovich Inalkayev (born 31 July 2004) is a Russian football player. He plays for FC Akhmat Grozny.

Club career
He made his debut for the main team of FC Akhmat Grozny on 22 September 2021 in a Russian Cup game against FC Kairat Moscow. He made his Russian Premier League debut for Akhmat on 26 September 2021 in a game against FC Rostov.

Career statistics

References

External links
 
 
 

2004 births
Living people
Russian footballers
Association football midfielders
FC Akhmat Grozny players
Russian Premier League players